This is a list of female cabinet ministers of Iceland.

List

See also
Government of Iceland
Cabinet of Iceland
Politics of Iceland

Iceland
List
Government of Iceland
Cabinet
Cabinet
Ministers